Osman Melgares (born 27 November 1986) is a Honduran footballer who currently plays for Real Sociedad of the Honduran Liga Nacional.

Career

Club
In February 2015, Melgares signed for Indy Eleven of the North American Soccer League, on a six-month loan deal. Melgares returned to Real Sociedad in July of the same year.

Personal life
In July 2015, shortly after returning to Honduras from his short spell with Indy Eleven, Melgares was involved in a car accident in which he broke his arm.

Career statistics

References

External links 
 Indy Eleven Profile
 

1986 births
Association football midfielders
Honduran footballers
Expatriate soccer players in the United States
C.D. Real Sociedad players
Indy Eleven players
Living people
Liga Nacional de Fútbol Profesional de Honduras players
North American Soccer League players